Hubert Aquin (24 October 1929 – 15 March 1977) was a Quebec novelist, political activist, essayist, filmmaker and editor.

Aquin was born in Montreal and graduated from the Université de Montréal in 1951. From 1951 to 1954, he studied at the Institut d'études politiques in Paris. On his return to Montreal worked for Radio-Canada from 1955 until 1959. From 1959 until 1964, he also worked as a screenwriter, director and film producer with the National Film Board of Canada.

From 1960 to 1968, Aquin was active in the movement for Quebec independence. He was an executive member of the first independentist political party, the Rassemblement pour l'indépendance nationale (1960–1969). In 1964, he announced that he was going "underground" to work for independence through terrorism; he was arrested shortly thereafter and detained for four months in a psychiatric hospital. It was there that he wrote his first novel, Prochain épisode (1965), the story of an imprisoned revolutionary. In December 1964, he was acquitted of illegal possession of a firearm.

Regarded as a classic of Canadian literature, Aquin's novel Next Episode (the English translation of Prochain épisode by Sheila Fischman), was chosen for the 2003 edition of CBC Radio's Canada Reads competition, where it was championed by journalist Denise Bombardier. It was the winning title. An earlier English translation by Penny Williams, keeping the French title, was published in 1967.

The self-destructive thoughts of the novel's narrator foreshadow Aquin's own death: On 15 March 1977, Aquin shot himself in the head. He left a suicide note claiming his death was a free and positive choice, stating, "I have lived intensely, and now it is over." A fuller understanding of Aquin's intense life can be gained from Jacques Godbout's biographical documentary, Deux épisodes dans la vie d'Hubert Aquin (1979) and from HA!: A Self-Murder Mystery (2003), an experiment in biography by Aquin's friend Gordon Sheppard.

Recognition 
The Université du Québec à Montréal (UQAM) named its main humanities building in his honour because he was the first director of the Département d'Études littéraires in 1969, a professor, and also because of his important novels and radio dramas.

See also 
Emmanuel Aquin, one of his three sons, also a writer
François Aquin, cousin, politician

Bibliography 
 Prochain épisode (Next Episode) — 1965
 Trou de mémoire (Blackout) — 1968
 L'Antiphonaire (The Antiphonary) — 1969
 Point de fuite — 1971
 Neige noire (Hamlet's Twin) — 1974
 Blocs erratiques — 1977
 L'Invention de la mort — written in 1959, published in 1990

Filmography
 À St-Henri le cinq septembre  — 1962

Further reading 
 Sheppard, Gordon, HA! A Self-Murder Mystery. (2003) Experimental biography centred on the suicide of Aquin and other notable suicides in literary history.
 Smart, Patricia, Hubert Aquin agent double, (1973).
 Legris, Renée, "Hubert Aquin et la radio. Une quête d'écriture (1954–1977)", Médiaspaul, (2004).
 Palumbo, Filippo, Hubert Aquin et la Gnose, PhD, Universite de Montreal (Canada), 2011, 349 pp., AAT NR74925; https://papyrus.bib.umontreal.ca/jspui/bitstream/1866/4817/2/Palumbo_Filippo_2010_these.pdf.

References

External links 
 
 Watch Two Episodes from the Life of Hubert Aquin (English-language version of Deux épisodes dans la vie d'Hubert Aquin) at the National Film Board of Canada

1929 births
1977 suicides
Canadian male novelists
French Quebecers
Writers from Montreal
Suicides by firearm in Quebec
Université de Montréal alumni
Prix Athanase-David winners
Quebec sovereigntists
Film directors from Montreal
20th-century Canadian novelists
Canadian novelists in French
Canadian Broadcasting Corporation people
National Film Board of Canada people
20th-century Canadian male writers
Governor General's Award-winning fiction writers
1977 deaths